Mariarosa Dalla Costa (born 1943 in Treviso) is an Italian autonomist feminist and co-author of the classic The Power of Women and the Subversion of the Community, with Selma James. This text launched the "domestic labour debate" by re-defining housework as reproductive labor necessary to the functioning of capital, rendered invisible by its removal from the wage-relation.

She was a co-founder of the International Feminist Collective, an organisation formed in Padua in 1972 to promote political debate and action around the issue of housework that gave rise to the International Wages for Housework Campaign.

Works
The Power of Women & the Subversion of the Community (with Selma James); Bristol: Falling Wall Press, 1972
Women, Development, and Labor of Reproduction: Struggles and Movements (edited with Giovanna F. Dalla Costa); Africa World Press, 1999
Gynocide: Hysterectomy, Capitalist Patriarchy and the Medical Abuse of Women (edited); Brooklyn: Autonomedia, 2007

See also
Wages for housework
Leopoldina Fortunati
Maria Mies
Silvia Federici

References

External links
 "Introduction to the Archive of Feminist Struggle for wages for housework. Donation by Mariarosa Dalla Costa", Viewpoint Magazine 5 (October 2015).
Mariarosa Dalla Costa - Works at Libcom.org
Tribute to Mariarosa Dalla Costa in The Commoner

1943 births
Living people
Autonomism
Italian feminists
Italian political scientists
Academic staff of the University of Padua
People from Treviso
Italian socialist feminists
Women political scientists